This is a list of amphibians of New Mexico: all frogs, toads, and salamanders native to the U.S. state of New Mexico.

New Mexico has extreme biomes, having mountain ranges down the east and west sides of the state, with forests in the west, desert in the central and eastern regions, and grasslands in the northeast near the border of Oklahoma. Despite its relatively, overall arid climate, it is home to a variety of amphibians.

New Mexico only protects a single species of amphibian, the Chiricahua leopard frog (Rana chiricahuensis). It is considered to be a threatened species.

Toads

True toads
Family Bufonidae (true toads)
Genus Bufo (toads)
Bufo alvarius (Colorado River toad)
Bufo boreas (western toad)
Bufo cognatus (Great Plains toad)
Bufo debilis (green toad)
Bufo microscaphus (southwestern toad)
Bufo punctatus (red-spotted toad)
Bufo speciosus (Texas toad)
Bufo woodhousii (Woodhouse's toad)

Narrowmouth toads
Family Microhylidae (narrowmouth toads)
Genus Gastrophryne
Gastrophryne olivacea (Great Plains narrowmouth toad)

Spadefoot toads
Family Scaphiopodidae (spadefoot toads)
Genus Scaphiopus (spadefoot toads)
Scaphiopus couchii (Couch's spadefoot toad)
Genus Spea (western spadefoot toads)
Spea bombifrons (Plains spadefoot toad)
Spea multiplicata (New Mexico spadefoot toad)

Frogs

Tree frogs
Family Hylidae (tree frogs)
Genus Acris (cricket frogs)
Acris crepitans (northern cricket frog)
Genus Hyla (tree frogs)
Hyla arenicolor (canyon tree frog)
Hyla eximia (mountain tree frog)
Genus Pseudacris (chorus frogs)
Pseudacris triseriata (western chorus frog)

Barking frogs
Family Leptodactylidae (tropical frogs)
Genus Eleutherodactylus (chirping frogs)
Eleutherodactylus augusti (eastern barking frog)

True frogs
Family Ranidae (true frogs)
Genus Rana (true frogs)
Rana catesbeiana (bullfrog)
Rana berlandieri (Rio Grande leopard frog)
Rana blairi (Plains leopard frog)
Rana chiricahuensis (Chiricahua leopard frog) (T)
Rana pipiens (northern leopard frog)

Salamanders

Mole salamanders
Family Ambystomatidae (mole salamanders)
Genus Ambystoma
Ambystoma tigrinum (tiger salamander)

Lungless salamanders
Family Plethodontidae (lungless salamanders)
Genus Aneides (climbing salamanders)
Aneides hardii (Sacramento Mountain salamander)
Genus Plethodon (woodland salamanders)
Plethodon neomexicanus (Jemez Mountains salamander)

References
Williamson, M. A.; Hyder, P. W. and Applegarth, J. S. (1994). Snakes, Lizards, Turtles, Frogs, Toads and Salamanders of New Mexico. Sunstone Press, Santa Fe, New Mexico.
US Fish & Wildlife Services: Southwest Region Ecological Services

External links
NWF—Frogwatch USA: Frogs of New Mexico

New Mexico
Amphibians
Amphibians
.